The Virgin Decalog books were collections of short stories published by Virgin Publishing based on the television series Doctor Who: they gained their name from the fact that each volume contained ten stories (although the last collection contains eleven). Five volumes were published between 1994 and September 1997, although volumes 4 and 5 did not feature the Doctor or any other non-Virgin copyrighted characters. This is because the BBC decided not to renew Virgin's licence to produce original fiction featuring the Doctor or any characters featured in the TV series (Virgin transitioned to featuring characters created for literature over which the BBC had no rights). Following this, the BBC began producing their own Doctor Who fiction, including short stories under the name Short Trips.

The Books

Decalog
The first volume of stories published was Decalog (Virgin, 17 March 1994), edited by Mark Stammers and Stephen James Walker. It contained the following stories:

The Story Playback by Stephen James Walker was a short linking piece that recurred between the other stories, detailing the story of an amnesiac claiming to be the Doctor having his memories restored by going through the items in his pockets: each item relates to one of the stories.

Decalog 2: Lost Property
The next volume was Decalog 2: Lost Property (Virgin Publishing, 20 July 1995), again edited by Mark Stammers and Stephen James Walker. This volume abandoned the linking story concept used in Decalog, and instead concentrated on having all its stories written on the same theme – a property that the Doctor owns somewhere or when in the universe. It contained the stories:

Decalog 3: Consequences
The final Decalog collection before Virgin lost their licence to use The Doctor and characters from the 1963–89 series was called Decalog 3: Consequences (Virgin Publishing, 18 July 1996), and was joint edited by Justin Richards and Andy Lane. It introduced a new idea for linking the stories whereby each story would contain an element from the previous and subsequent stories, and the first contained an element from the last and vice versa. It contained the following stories:

This was Steven Moffat's first Doctor Who work. He later went on to write for the 2005 revival of the television series, and would become head writer for the series from the 2010 season onwards. Jackie Marshall was an established writer of Doctor Who fan fiction at the time. DeCandido went on to write novels for the Star Trek franchise. Moffat would later use many plot elements from Continuity Errors as the basis for the 2010 Christmas Special, as well as for River Song's backstory in "Let's Kill Hitler".

Decalog 4: Re-Generations
The first Decalog collection after Virgin lost their licence to use Doctor Who TV characters was called Decalog 4: Re-Generations (Virgin Publishing, 15 May 1997), and was again joint edited by Justin Richards and Andy Lane. In order to try to keep the audience of previous Decalogs even though the Doctor could no longer appear in the stories, it was decided to theme the collection around the family history of one of the Doctor's companion Roz Forrester. As this companion had been created by co-editor Andy Lane for the Virgin New Adventures, there were no copyright issues in including her. It contained the following stories:

Decalog 5: Wonders
The final Decalog collection was called Decalog 5: Wonders (Virgin Publishing, 18 September 1997), and was jointly edited by Paul Leonard and Jim Mortimore. This time, all but one story were free-standing science fiction pieces on the theme of "the Ten Wonders of the Universe", without direct connection to the Doctor Who universe. One story, The Judgement of Solomon by Lawrence Miles, however features former New Adventures companion, Bernice Summerfield. The collection contained the following stories:

Following the publication of this book, Virgin produced no further Decalog collections.

References

Book series introduced in 1994
Novels based on Doctor Who
Science fiction book series
1990s books
Virgin Books books